Kundrakudi is a village in Sivaganga district that houses a famous Murugan temple, Shanmughanathar Temple, atop a small hill near Karaikudi, India.

Location and places of interest
Kundrakudi is situated very near to Karaikudi, the heartland of Chettinadu.  Many famous temples such as Pillayar patti Karpaga Vinayagar Temple, Bhairavar Kovil Bhairavar Swamy Temple, Nemam koil, Ariyakudi Thiruvenkatamudayan Temple, Thirupathur Thiruthalinathar Temple, Thirukostiyur Sowmyanarayar Temple are very near to Kundrakudi.

External links 
 Shanmughanathar temple dinamalar

Villages in Sivaganga district